Dodongo may stand for:

 Dodongo, a reptilian monster from The Legend of Zelda video game series.
 Dodongo (Ultra monster), a mummified dragon-like monster from the Ultraman television series.